Shamsul Alam Pramanik ( – 30 January 2023) was a Bangladeshi National Party politician who was a Member of Parliament for Naogaon-4.

Career
Pramanik was elected to parliament from Naogaon-4 as a Bangladesh Nationalist Party candidate in 1996 and 2001. He had faced accusations of supporting Bangla Bhai, an Islamist terrorist, and his extremist organisation. He was sued by the Government of Bangladesh for providing financial support to Jamaat-ul-Mujahideen Bangladesh, an extremist terrorist organisation, in 2008.

Death 
Pramanik died from complications of diabetes on 30 January 2023, at the age of 70.

References

1950s births
Year of birth missing
2023 deaths
Deaths from diabetes
7th Jatiya Sangsad members
8th Jatiya Sangsad members
Bangladesh Nationalist Party politicians
People from Naogaon District